Diphenylditelluride is the chemical compound with the formula (C6H5Te)2, abbreviated Ph2Te2  This orange-coloured solid is the oxidized derivative of the unstable benzenetellurol, PhTeH.  Ph2Te2 is used as a source of the PhTe unit in organic synthesis and as a catalyst for redox reactions.

Preparation
Ph2Te2 is prepared by the oxidation of tellurophenolate, which is generated via the Grignard reagent:
PhMgBr  +  Te  →  PhTeMgBr
2PhTeMgBr  + 0.5 O2  +  H2O  →  Ph2Te2  +  2 MgBr(OH)

The molecule has C2 symmetry.

References

Phenyl compounds
Organotellurium compounds